United Mine Workers of America v. Bagwell, 512 U.S. 821 (1994), was a case in which the United States Supreme Court laid out the constitutional limitations for the use of contempt powers by courts.

Facts
A trial court enjoined striking unions in Virginia from undertaking certain unlawful activities (throwing things, threatening, obstructing, and picketing without supervision); when union members repeatedly violated the injunction, the trial court established a schedule of $100,000 fine for future violent breaches, $20,000 fine for future non-violent breaches; after more violations of the injunction, the trial court ended up assessing $64 million, including $12 million to the plaintiff in the civil case and $52 million to the county and the commonwealth of Virginia. The parties settled, but the trial court refused to vacate the fines to be paid to the county and commonwealth. The Virginia appellate court reversed the trial court, but the Virginia Supreme Court reversed the appellate court. Appeal was then taken to the U.S. Supreme Court.

Issue
Were these fines civil, or were they criminal (in which case due process and jury would be required)?

Opinion of the Court
The Court, in an opinion by Justice Blackmun, held that a contempt sanction is civil if it is remedial and for the benefit of the complainant—if it either coerces the defendant into compliance with the court’s order or compensates the complainant for losses sustained. But where a fine is not compensatory, it is civil only if the contemnor is afforded an opportunity to "purge" (avoid or reduce fine through compliance); otherwise, it is criminal contempt.

Therefore, there could be no compensation to the plaintiff as there was no opportunity for the defendant to purge the contempt. Therefore, these were criminal fines, which required appropriate due process—a trial by jury—which had not been afforded.

Justice Scalia wrote a concurring opinion, expressing concern about the judge also acting as rulemaker and enforcer. Justice Ginsburg also wrote a concurring opinion, joined by Chief Justice Rehnquist, further elucidating the distinction between civil and criminal fines.

See also
 List of United States Supreme Court cases, volume 512
 List of United States Supreme Court cases
 Lists of United States Supreme Court cases by volume
 List of United States Supreme Court cases by the Rehnquist Court

References

External links

United States Supreme Court cases
United States Supreme Court cases of the Rehnquist Court
United States labor case law
United Mine Workers of America litigation
1994 in United States case law
1994 in Virginia
Mining in Virginia
Coal mining in the United States